Sergio Casimiro Suárez Aimée (born 4 March 1962) is a retired Cuban gymnast. He competed for Cuba at the 1980 Summer Olympics in the men's individual and team all-around competitions. His best performance was in the horizontal bar portion, where he advanced to the final and finished sixth.

Suarez has been assistant coach of the men’s gymnastics team at Ohio State University since 2011.

References

1962 births
Living people
Cuban male artistic gymnasts
Olympic gymnasts of Cuba
Gymnasts at the 1980 Summer Olympics
Gymnasts at the 1979 Pan American Games
Pan American Games medalists in gymnastics
Pan American Games gold medalists for Cuba
Pan American Games silver medalists for Cuba
Pan American Games bronze medalists for Cuba
Gymnasts at the 1983 Pan American Games
Gymnasts at the 1987 Pan American Games
Medalists at the 1979 Pan American Games
Medalists at the 1987 Pan American Games
21st-century Cuban people
20th-century Cuban people